Sri Krishna Nagar railway station is a small railway station in Jaunpur District, Uttar Pradesh. Its code is SKN. It serves Badlapur town. The station consists of two platforms. The platforms are not well sheltered. It lacks many facilities including water and sanitation.

References 

Lucknow NR railway division
Railway stations in Jaunpur district